Vecchi is an Italian surname. Notable people with this surname include:  

 Orazio Vecchi (1550-1605), Italian composer and choirmaster
 Alessandro Vecchi (born 1991), Italian footballer 
 Augusto Vittorio Vecchi (1842-1932), Italian naval officer and author
 Irene Vecchi (born 1989), Italian sabre fencer
 Eligio Vecchi (1910-1968), Italian professional football player
 Giovanni Vecchi, Italian general in the Royal Italian Army 
 Juan Edmundo Vecchi (1931-2002), Italian Roman Catholic Priest 
 Luca Vecchi (born 1972), Italian politician
 Mario Vecchi (born 1957), Italian judoka
 Natale Vecchi (born 1917), Italian wrestler
 Paolo Vecchi (born 1959), Italian former volleyball player
 Stefano Vecchi (born 1971), Italian professional footballer turned coach
 Villiam Vecchi (born 1948), Italian former football goalkeeper

Other 
 Vecchi Editore
 Vecchi Ketchup Factory

See also 

 De Vecchi
 De Vecchis
 Vecchio (disambiguation)
 Vecchio
 Veche (disambiguation)

Italian words and phrases
Italian-language surnames